Lawrence Siphiwe Tshabalala (born 25 September 1984) is a South African professional football player who most recently played as a midfielder for AmaZulu.

He is considered to be one of the most well-known and decorated South African soccer players of his generation. He was the first player to make his international debut while still playing in the National First Division. At 90 caps, he is the second most capped player of the South African national team and played at three African Cup of Nations editions and the 2010 FIFA World Cup, at which he scored the first goal on 11 June 2010 which was nominated for the FIFA Puskás Award. Tshabalala, who was recently released by Amazulu FC, is a winger but has played other midfielder roles.

Early life
Tshabalala was born on 25 September 1984 in Phiri, as the first born of two children to parents Isaac Tshabalala (born 1964) and Hadifele Rebecca (née Makhubu) (1965–2010). His younger sister is named Mpumi. He grew up and lived in a face brick house until he was 19, that was owned by his grandparents. He lived  there with his cousins and sister. His father worked as a taxi driver. He attended secondary school at Seanamarena Secondary School in Phiri, Soweto. Tshabalala aspired to be a chartered accountant as a young boy.

Club career

Kaizer Chiefs
Tshabalala played at the Kaizer Chiefs academy but only broke through to the senior team after spells with Alexandra United and Free State Stars. In January 2007 Chiefs brought back their own product after Ea Lla Koto was relegated to the National First Division at the end of the 2005/06 campaign. At the time, Tshabalala was then sidelined for six months due to a serious knee injury.

2007–08 season
Tshabalala eventually made his debut in a 1–0 loss to Bidvest Wits on 31 August 2007. Tshabalala made his Soweto derby debut on 24 November 2007 in a 2–2 draw. Tshabalala played his first ever cup final on 1 December 2007 in the Telkom Knockout winning after a penalty shootout against Mamelodi Sundowns and played the full 120 minutes. He scored his first Chiefs goal on 12 December 2007 in a 4–2 win over Golden Arrows.

2008–09 season
Tshabalala continued to consistently deliver great goals, winning him the Player and Players’ Player of the Year at the Kaizer Chiefs Awards Ceremony. He also picked up the Website Player of the Year, Goal of the Season and Readers’ Choice awards.
All-and-all Tshabalala left the awards with R170 000 in prize-money, as well as a Nissan X-Trail.

2015–16 season
On 25 August 2015, Tshabalala gained attention for a volleyed goal from well outside the area which was nominated as one of the goals of the South African season. The goal, which came in a 4–0 win over Free State Stars F.C. coincidentally took place at the FNB Stadium in Johannesburg, the same venue where Tshabalala had scored a similar goal against Mexico in the world cup five years earlier.

He made a total of 372 appearances scoring 58 goals.

Büyükşehir Belediye Erzurumspor
On 28 August 2018, Kaizer Chiefs announced that Tshabalala would be leaving for Turkish side Büyükşehir Belediye Erzurumspor.

AmaZulu
Tshabalala returned to South Africa in October 2020, joining South African Premier Division club AmaZulu F.C. He signed a one-year contract with the option of a second year. He was released in August 2021.

International career
Tshabalala was one of the first players to be called up to the national team while still playing in the National First Division. Tshabalala made his national team debut in a friendly against Egypt on 14 January 2006. He was part of the South African squad at 2006 African Nations Cup, 2008 African Nations Cup, 2013 African Nations Cup, and the 2009 FIFA Confederations Cup. On 11 June 2010, gaining his 50th cap for the nation of South Africa, he scored the opening goal of the 2010 FIFA World Cup against Mexico in the 55th minute, which erupted the full Soccer City (FNB Stadium) into wild celebrations. The game finished a 1–1 draw. That goal eventually made the shortlist for the Puskas Award, a nomination for goal of the year by FIFA.

In October 2017, Tshabalala was called up to two of South Africa's World Cup qualifying matches against Senegal – for the first time since 2014.

Style of play
Goal.com described Tshabalala as "a tricky winger with pace and can deliver fantastic crosses. His left boot can pack a powerful shot and he is a great option for set pieces as he has the ability to bend the ball".

Endorsements
In October 2009, Tshabalala and Arsenal's Cesc Fàbregas were the first two players to launch the new Nike CTR360 Maestri boots.

Personal life
Tshabalala's mother Rebecca Hadifele "Hadi" Makhubu (1965–2010) died on 5 December 2010, after sustaining a head injury after falling at a bridal shower which she was attending with her husband Isaac. She was buried at the Avalon Cemetery on 11 December 2010 in Soweto. The funeral was attended by notable figures such as Pitso Mosimane, Jimmy Tau, Morgan Gould as well as a performance by Joyous Celebration. A Limpopo man named Samson Nangani claimed that Tshabalala was his child and lost contact with his mother while she was still pregnant. Tshabalala denied being his son.

Tshabalala was involved in a love scandal with Zanele Khanye Skhosana and former Atlético Madrid academy player Robin Ngalande, where one of them allegedly impregnated her. Tshabalala's first child, Owami, a boy, was born on 6 February 2015 by former Miss SA, Bokang Montjane whom he had been dating since 2012. The pair married in 2016.

International goals
Scores and results list South Africa's goal tally first, score column indicates score after each Tshabalala goal.

Honours
Free State Stars
 Baymed Cup: 2006

Kaizer Chiefs
 Absa Premiership: 2012–2013, 2014–2015
 MTN 8: 2008
 Nedbank Cup: 2013
 Telkom Knockout: 2007, 2010, 2011
 Vodacom Challenge: 2009
 Telkom Charity Cup: 2010

Individual
 SAFA Awards SAFA Footballer of the Year: 2010

References

External links
 
 

1984 births
Living people
Sportspeople from Soweto
Association football wingers
Association football midfielders
South African soccer players
South Africa international soccer players
Free State Stars F.C. players
Kaizer Chiefs F.C. players
AmaZulu F.C. players
Büyükşehir Belediye Erzurumspor footballers
2006 Africa Cup of Nations players
2008 Africa Cup of Nations players
2009 FIFA Confederations Cup players
2010 FIFA World Cup players
2013 Africa Cup of Nations players
South Africa A' international soccer players
2014 African Nations Championship players